Urasa may refer to several places:

 Pakhli, an historic region once part of the Mughal province of Punjab once known as Urasa
 Urasa, Niigata, subdivision of Minamiuonuma, Japan
 Urăsa River
 Urasa Station, a railway station located in Minamiuonuma, Niigata, Japan